Debora LMP2 refers to a series of Le Mans Prototypes built by Debora:

Debora LMP200, used between 2001 and 2003.
Debora LMP201, used in 1995.
Debora LMP294, used in 1994.
Debora LMP295, used in 1995.
Debora LMP296, used between 1996 and 1999.
Debora LMP297, used between 1997 and 1998.
Debora LMP299, used between 2000 and 2002.
Debora LMP2000, used in 2000.

Debora vehicles